Warrenville Elementary School, originally known as Warrenville Graded School, was constructed in 1925 and used to educate mill village children located in and around the Warrenville, South Carolina area. In 1954, two wings were added to the building. This Aiken County, South Carolina school was listed on the National Register of Historic Places on May 22, 2002.

William W. Simmons & Son are the architects who designed the school and six others in Aiken County, and have been described as "an obscure architecture firm working out of Augusta, Georgia during the 1920s and active until 1951."  W.W. Simmons also designed the NRHP-listed Lyons Woman's Club House in Lyons, Georgia.

References

School buildings on the National Register of Historic Places in South Carolina
School buildings completed in 1925
Buildings and structures in Aiken County, South Carolina
National Register of Historic Places in Aiken County, South Carolina
1925 establishments in South Carolina